Charles Fennelly Van Der Byl (5 April 1874 – 9 February 1956) was a British fencer. He competed in the individual sabre and épée events at the 1912 Summer Olympics. In 1912, he won the sabre title at the British Fencing Championships.

References

External links
 

1874 births
1956 deaths
British male fencers
Olympic fencers of Great Britain
Fencers at the 1912 Summer Olympics
People from Paddington
Sportspeople from London